Zafar Ahmad Chaudhry (Urdu: ظفر احمد چودھری;  b. 19 August 1926 – 17 December 2019), was a Pakistani human rights activist and an airline executive who served as the first Chief of Air Staff of Pakistan Air Force, appointed in 1972 until his resignation in 1974.

Early life and education
Zafar Ahmad Chaudhry was born in Sialkot, Punjab, in British India on 19 August 1926 in to a Arain family belonging to the Ahmadiyya Movement.

He enrolled at the Punjab University in Lahore, and graduated with bachelor's degree in 1944, and then joined the Royal Indian Air Force.

Military service 
In 1945, Chaudhry was commissioned in the Royal Indian Air Force as a pilot officer, and was inducted in No. 7 Squadron in 1946. After the partition of India, he subsequently went to join the Pakistan Air Force, and qualified as an instructor on the North American T-6G Harvard . He was further educated at the RAF Staff College in Andover, Hampshire, in the United Kingdom before being directed to attend the Joint Service Defence College of the British Army. He later secured his qualification from the Imperial Defence College before returning to Pakistan.

In 1965, Air Commodore Chaudhry served in the Air Headquarters as a Director Air Operations, taking responsibility for planning combat aerial operations against the Indian Air Force during the second war with India. In 1969, Chaudhry was appointed station commander of the PAF Station Sargodha.

In 1971, Air Vice-Marshal Chaudhry was sent on secondment and was appointed managing director of the Pakistan International Airlines, which he directed until 1972.

On 3 April 1972, Air Marshal Chaudhry was appointed first Chief of Air Staff and took over the command of the Pakistan Air Force. In 1973, he authorised the Air Intelligence to conduct inquiries for the court-martial of several senior air force officers for their alleged political role in de-stabilising the civilian government.

This decision sparked controversy between the Air Force and the civilian government. Eventually, the decision was reversed upon being determined that the investigation was opened for inappropriate reasons, allowing the alleged officers to continue their military service in 1974. Upon learning of this development, Chaudhry immediately tendered his resignation taking the honourable course of action. Not known for affluence he took a job in USA selling cars. Later he joined Mr Babar Ali in Lahore to look after WWF in Pakistan.  He was a brilliant officer who fell to the politics of PPP government and the prevalent anti-Ahmadi sentiment.

Post retirement
Chaudhry was the last air marshal to command the Air Force, and was succeeded by Zulfiqar Ali Khan, the Air Force's first four-star general. After his retirement, Chaudhry became an activist, returned to Pakistan, and was one of the founding members of the Human Rights Commission of Pakistan in the 1980s, subsequently serving on its council.

On 17 December 2019, Chaudhry died of cardiac arrest, aged 93, in Lahore, Pakistan.

Awards and decorations

Foreign Decorations

References

External links
Bio of Air Marshal Zafar Chaudhry
About the HRCP

1926 births
2019 deaths
People from Sialkot
Punjabi people
Pakistani Ahmadis
C
Indian Air Force officers
Pakistani expatriates in the United Kingdom
Graduates of the Royal College of Defence Studies
Graduates of Joint Services Command and Staff College
Military personnel of the Indo-Pakistani War of 1965
Pakistan Air Force air marshals
People in aviation
Pakistan International Airlines people
Air marshals of the Indo-Pakistani War of 1971
Chiefs of Air Staff, Pakistan
Pakistani human rights activists